Jaroslav Hlinka (born November 10, 1976 in Prague, Czechoslovakia) is a Czech former professional ice hockey forward who played in the National Hockey League for the Colorado Avalanche. He is currently the Sports manager for his longtime club, HC Sparta Praha of the Czech Extraliga.

Playing career
Hlinka began playing ice hockey at the age of four. When he was fourteen, HC Sparta Praha of the Czech Extraliga offered him a chance on their junior team and he accepted.

From 1994 to 2007, Hlinka mostly played for HC Sparta Praha in the Extraliga, scoring 110 goals and winning the Czech Championship four times (2000, 2002, 2006 and 2007). From 2002 to 2006 he played for three seasons with Kloten Flyers in the Swiss Nationalliga A and one season with Ak Bars Kazan in the now defunct Russian Super League.

On June 1, 2007, Hlinka signed a one-year contract with the Colorado Avalanche in the NHL. He made his NHL debut with the Avalanche on October 3, 2007, during the season opener, scoring his first NHL points as part of a 2-assist game against the Dallas Stars. He scored his first NHL goal on October 23, 2007 against the Edmonton Oilers. After a bright start Hlinka's opportunities with the Avalanche diminished as the season wore on, however, he finished the 2007–08 season with a modest 28 points in 63 games.

In May 2008 he signed a two-year contract with Linköpings HC in the Swedish Elitserien. In 2008–09, his first season with Linköpings, Jaroslav led the team in scoring with 55 points finishing with the most assists in the Elitserien. After starting the 2009–10 season on loan to hometown club Sparta Praha, Hlinka returned to Linköpings to score 50 points in 41 games before losing to Djurgårdens IF in the playoff semi-finals.

On August 8, 2012, Hlinka again returned to the Czech Extraliga to begin the season for a fourth consecutive year, added with the option of potentially remaining with HC Sparta Praha for the duration of the 2012–13 season.

Following the 2018–19 season, Hlinka ended his 25 year professional career, finishing as HC Sparta Praha's All-time leading scorer. He immediately was announced to remain in the organization as the club's sporting manager.

International play

Hlinka played his first game in the national squad in 1999, and has played 114 times for the national team Hlinka has represented the Czech Republic seven times in the World Championships. He won a Gold medal at the Ice Hockey World Championship in 2001, along with a Silver medal at the Ice Hockey World Championship in 2006.

Career statistics

Regular season and playoffs

International

References

External links

1976 births
Living people
Ak Bars Kazan players
Colorado Avalanche players
Czech ice hockey centres
Czech expatriate ice hockey players in Russia
HC Berounští Medvědi players
HC Karlovy Vary players
HC Plzeň players
HC Sparta Praha players
EHC Kloten players
Linköping HC players
Ice hockey people from Prague
Undrafted National Hockey League players
Czech expatriate ice hockey players in the United States
Czech expatriate ice hockey players in Sweden
Czech expatriate ice hockey players in Switzerland
Ice hockey executives
Czech sports executives and administrators